Jean Louis Marie Le Pen (born 20 June 1928) is a French far-right politician who served as President of the National Front from 1972 to 2011. He also served as Honorary President of the National Front from 2011 to 2015.

Le Pen graduated from the faculty of law in Paris in 1949. After his time in the military, he studied political science and law at Panthéon-Assas University.

Le Pen focuses on issues related to immigration to France, the European Union, traditional culture and values, law and order, and France's high rate of unemployment. His progression in the 1980s is known as the "lepénisation of minds" due to its noticeable effect on mainstream political opinion. His controversial speeches and his integration into public life have made him a figure who polarizes opinion, considered the "Devil of the Republic" among his opponents or the "last samurai in politics" among his supporters. He has been convicted for statements downplaying the Holocaust, and fined for incitement to discrimination regarding remarks made about Muslims in France.

His longevity in politics and his five attempts to become President of France have made him a major figure in French political life. His progress to the second round in the 2002 presidential election left its mark on French public life, and the "21st of April" is now a frequently used expression in France. A former Member of the European Parliament (MEP), Le Pen served as the Honorary President of the National Front from 2011 to 2015. He was expelled from the party by his daughter Marine in 2015, after new controversial statements.

Life and career

Early life
Jean Louis Marie Le Pen was the only son of Jean Le Pen (1901–1942). Jean Le Pen was born in Brittany, like his ancestors, and had started work at the age of 13 on a transatlantic vessel. He was the president of L'Association des Ancients Combattants and Councilor of La Trinité-sur-Mer. Jean-Marie Le Pen's mother, Anne-Marie Hervé (1904–1965) was a seamstress and also of local ancestry.

Le Pen was born on 20 June 1928 in La Trinité-sur-Mer, a small seaside village in Brittany, the son of Anne Marie Hervé and Jean Le Pen, a fisherman. He was orphaned as an adolescent (Ward of the Nation, brought up by the state), when his father's boat La Persévérance was blown up by a mine in 1942. He was raised as a Roman Catholic and studied at the Jesuit high school François Xavier in Vannes, then at the lycée of Lorient.

In November 1944, aged 16, he was turned down (because of his age) by Colonel Henri de La Vaissière (then representative of the Communist Youth) when he attempted to join the French Forces of the Interior (FFI). He then entered the faculty of law in Paris, and started to sell the monarchist Action Française newspaper, Aspects de la France, in the street. He was repeatedly convicted of assault and battery (coups et blessures).

Le Pen started his political career as the head of the student union in Toulouse. He became president of the Association corporative des étudiants en droit, an association of law students whose main occupation was to engage in street brawls against the "Cocos" (communists). He was excluded from this organisation in 1951.

After his time in the military, he studied political science and law at Panthéon-Assas University. His graduate thesis, submitted in 1971 by him and Jean-Loup Vincent, was titled Le courant anarchiste en France depuis 1945 or ("The anarchist movement in France since 1945").

Military service
After receiving his law degree, he enlisted in the Foreign Legion. He arrived in Indochina after the 1954 battle of Dien Bien Phu, which had been lost by France and which prompted French Prime Minister Pierre Mendès France to put an end to the Indochina war at the Geneva Conference. Le Pen was then sent to Suez in 1956, but arrived only after the cease-fire.

In 1953, a year before the beginning of the Algerian War, he contacted President Vincent Auriol, who approved Le Pen's proposed volunteer disaster relief project after a flood in the Netherlands. Within two days, there were 40 volunteers from his university, a group that would later help victims of an earthquake in Italy. In Paris in 1956, he was elected to the National Assembly as a member of Pierre Poujade's UDCA populist party. Le Pen has often presented himself as the youngest member of the Assembly, but a young communist, André Chène, 27 years old and half a year younger, was elected in the same year.

In 1957, Le Pen became the General Secretary of the National Front of Combatants, a veterans' organization, as well as the first French politician to nominate a Muslim candidate, Ahmed Djebbour, an Algerian, elected in 1957 as deputy of Paris. The next year, following his break with Poujade, he was reelected to the National Assembly as a member of the Centre National des Indépendants et Paysans (CNIP) party, led by Antoine Pinay.

Le Pen claimed that he had lost his left eye when he was savagely beaten during the 1958 election campaign. Testimonies suggest that he was only wounded in the right eye and did not lose it. He lost the sight in his left eye years later, due to an illness. (Popular belief is that he wears a glass eye.) During the 1950s, Le Pen took a close interest in the Algerian War (1954–62) and the French defence budget.

Elected deputy of the French Parliament under the Poujadist banner, Le Pen voluntarily reengaged himself for two to three months in the French Foreign Legion. He was then sent to Algeria (1957) as an intelligence officer. He has been accused of having engaged in torture. Le Pen has denied these accusations, although he admitted knowing of its use.

Far-right politics
Le Pen directed the 1965 presidential campaign of far-right candidate Jean-Louis Tixier-Vignancour, who obtained 5.19% of the votes. He insisted on the rehabilitation of the Collaborationists, declaring that:

In 1962, Le Pen lost his seat in the Assembly. He created the Serp (Société d'études et de relations publiques) firm, a company involved in the music industry, which specialized in historical recordings and sold recordings of the choir of the CGT trade-union and songs of the Popular Front, as well as Nazi marches.

National Front

In 1972, Le Pen founded the Front National (FN) party. He then ran in the 1974 presidential election, obtaining 0.74% of the vote. In 1976, his Parisian flat was dynamited (he lived at that time in his mansion of Montretout in Saint-Cloud). The crime was never solved. Le Pen then failed to obtain the 500 signatures from "grand electors" (grands électeurs, mayors, etc.) necessary to present himself in the 1981 presidential election, won by the candidate of the Socialist Party (PS), François Mitterrand.

Criticizing immigration and taking advantage of the economic crisis striking France and the world since the 1973 oil crisis, Le Pen's party managed to increase its support in the 1980s, starting in the municipal elections of 1983. His popularity has been greatest in the south and east of France. The FN obtained 16 seats in the 1984 European elections. A total of 35 FN deputies entered the Assembly after the 1986 elections (the only legislative elections held under proportional representation), which were won by the right wing, bringing Jacques Chirac to Matignon in the first cohabitation government (that is, the combination of a right-wing Prime minister, Chirac, with a socialist President, Mitterrand). In Paris, Jean-Marie Le Pen was elected to the National Assembly.

In 1984, Le Pen won a seat in the European Parliament and has been consistently reelected since then. In 1988 he lost his reelection bid for the French National Assembly in the Bouches-du-Rhône's 8th constituency. He was defeated in the second round by Socialist Marius Masse. In 1991 Le Pen's invite to London by Conservative MPs was militantly protested by large numbers coordinated by the Campaign Against Fascism in Europe, CAFE, which led to a surge of anti-fascist groups and activity across Europe. In 1992 and 1998 he was elected to the regional council of Provence-Alpes-Côte-d'Azur.

Le Pen ran in the French presidential elections in 1974, 1988, 1995, 2002, and 2007. As noted above, he was not able to run for office in 1981, having failed to gather the necessary 500 signatures of elected officials. In the presidential elections of 2002, Le Pen obtained 16.86% of the votes in the first round of voting. This was enough to qualify him for the second round, as a result of the poor showing by the PS candidate and incumbent prime minister Lionel Jospin and the scattering of votes among 15 other candidates. This was a major political event, both nationally and internationally, as it was the first time someone with such far right views had qualified for the second round of the French presidential elections. There was a widespread stirring of national public opinion as virtually the entire French political spectrum from the centre-right to the left united in fierce opposition to Le Pen's ideas. More than one million people in France took part in street rallies; slogans such as "A crook is better than a fascist" ("Un escroc mieux qu'un facho") and "Graft rather than hate, Chirac rather than Le Pen" ("L'arnaque plutôt que la haine, Chirac plutôt que Le Pen") were heard in opposition to Le Pen. Le Pen was then defeated by a large margin in the second round, when incumbent president Jacques Chirac obtained 82% of the votes, thus securing the biggest majority in the history of the Fifth Republic.

In the 2004 regional elections, Le Pen intended to run for office in the Provence-Alpes-Côte d'Azur region but was prevented from doing so because he did not meet the conditions for being a voter in that region: he neither lived there nor was registered as a taxpayer there. However, he was planned to be the FN's top candidate in the region for the 2010 regional elections.

Le Pen again ran in the 2007 French presidential election and finished fourth. His 2007 campaign, at the age of 78 years and 9 months, makes him the oldest candidate for presidential office in French history.

Le Pen has been a vocal critic of the European Reform Treaty (formally known as the Treaty of Lisbon) which was signed by EU member states on 13 December 2007, and entered into force on 1 December 2009. In October 2007, Le Pen suggested that he would personally visit Ireland to assist the "No" campaign but finally changed his mind, fearing that his presence would be used against the supporters of the NO vote. Ireland finally refused to ratify the treaty. Ireland is the only EU country which had a citizen referendum. All other EU states, including France, ratified the treaty by parliamentary vote, despite a previous citizen referendum where over 55% of French voters rejected the European Reform Treaty (although that vote was on a different draft of the Treaty in the form of the Constitutional Treaty). After the Irish "No" vote, Le Pen addressed the French President Nicolas Sarkozy in the European Parliament, accusing him of furthering the agenda of a "cabal of international finance and free market fanatics." Ireland has since accepted the treaty in a second Lisbon referendum.

After Le Pen left office in January 2011, his daughter Marine Le Pen was elected by the adherents of the party against Bruno Gollnisch. He became honorary chairman of the party and won his seat again at the European elections in 2014.

On 4 May 2015, Le Pen was suspended from the party after refusing to attend his disciplinary hearing for describing the gas chambers, used in concentration camps during the Holocaust, as a "detail" of history. A French court decided in June to cancel this suspension; although the members of the party were to hold a vote to accept or reject a whole series of measures aiming at changing the National Front's status, including Le Pen's Honorary Presidency. On July 10, another French court ruled to suspend the vote two days beforehand and urged the party to organize an in-person Congress, as Le Pen sued the National Front again. The party decided to appeal against both of these decisions. The FN then decided, on July 29, to count the votes on the suppression of Le Pen's Honorary Presidency, which showed that 94% of the members were in favor of this decision. However, due to the legal challenges to the FN's removal of Le Pen as its honorary president, he continued to officially hold the position.

In August 2015, Le Pen was expelled from the National Front after a special party congress. He has since founded the Comités Jeanne.

Personal life, wealth and security

Le Pen's marriage to Pierrette Le Pen from 29 June 1960 to 18 March 1987 resulted in three daughters, who have given him eight grandchildren. The break-up of the marriage was somewhat dramatic, with his ex-wife posing nude, to ridicule him, in the French edition of Playboy which printed  100,000 more than the normal production of 150,000 nevertheless needed to print a second printing of 150,000, to satisfy demand. Marie-Caroline, one of his daughters, broke with Le Pen, following her husband to join Bruno Mégret, who split from the FN to found the rival Mouvement National Républicain (MNR, National Republican Movement). The youngest of Le Pen's daughters, Marine Le Pen, is leader of the National Rally. On 31 May 1991, Jean-Marie Le Pen married Jeanne-Marie Paschos ("Jany"), of Greek descent. Born in 1933, Paschos was previously married to Belgian businessman Jean Garnier.

In 1977, Le Pen inherited a fortune from Hubert Lambert (1934–1976), son of the cement industrialist Leon Lambert (1877–1952), one of three sons of Lambert Cement founder Hilaire Lambert. Hubert Lambert was a political supporter of Le Pen and a monarchist as well. Lambert's will provided 30 million francs (approximately €5 million) to Le Pen, as well as his opulent three-storey 11-room mansion at 8 Parc de Montretout, Saint-Cloud, in the western suburbs of Paris. The home had been built by Napoleon III for his chief of staff Jean-François Mocquard. With his wife, he also owns a two-story townhouse on the Rue Hortense in Rueil-Malmaison and another house in his hometown of La Trinité-sur-Mer.

In the early 1980s, Le Pen's personal security was assured by KO International Company, a subsidiary of VHP Security, a private security firm, and an alleged front organisation for SAC, the Service d'Action Civique (Civic Action Service), a Gaullist organisation. SAC allegedly employed figures with organized crime backgrounds and from the far-right movement.

Electoral record
National Assembly of France
Member of the National Assembly of France for Paris: 1956–1962 / 1986–1988. Elected in 1956, reelected in 1958, 1986.
President of the National Front political grouping: 1986–1988.

Municipal Council
Municipal councillor for the 20th arrondissement of Paris: 1983–1989.

European Parliament
Member of European Parliament: 1984–2003 (Sentenced by the courts in 2003) / Since 2004. Elected in 1984, reelected in 1989, 1994, 1999, 2004, 2009, 2014.

Regional Council
Regional councillor of Île-de-France : 1986–1992.
Regional councillor of Provence-Alpes-Côte d'Azur: 1992–2000 (sentenced by the courts in 2000) / Since 2010–2015. Reelected in 1998, 2010.

Issues and policy positions

See also National Rally for more information of Le Pen's views.

Death penalty
Le Pen supports bringing back the death penalty in France.

Controversial statements

Le Pen has been accused and convicted several times at home and abroad of xenophobia and antisemitism. A Paris court found in February 2005 that his verbal criticisms, such as remarks disparaging Muslims in a 2003 Le Monde interview, were "inciting racial hatred", and he was fined €10,000 and ordered to pay an additional €5,000 in damages to the Ligue des droits de l'homme (League for Human Rights). The conviction and fines were upheld by the Court of Cassation in 2006.

 In May 1987, he advocated the forced isolation from society of all people infected with HIV, by placing them in a special "sidatorium". "Sidaïque" is Le Pen's pejorative solecism for "person infected with AIDS" (the more usual French term is "séropositif" (seropositive)) The term "sidatorium" was coined by François Bachelot.
 On 21 June 1995, he attacked singer Patrick Bruel, who is of Algerian Jewish descent, on his policy of no longer singing in the city of Toulon because the city had just elected a mayor from the National Front. Le Pen said, "the city of Toulon will then have to get along without the vocalisations of singer Benguigui". Benguigui, an Algerian name, is Bruel's birth name.
 In February 1997, Le Pen accused Chirac of being "on the payroll of Jewish organizations, and particularly of the B'nai B'rith"
 Le Pen once made the infamous pun "Durafour-crématoire" ("four crématoire" meaning "crematory oven") about then-minister Michel Durafour, who had said in public a few days before, "One must exterminate the National Front".
On many occasions, before and after the FIFA World Cup, he claimed that the French World Cup squad contained too many non-white players, and was not an accurate reflection of French society. He went on to scold players for not singing La Marseillaise, saying they were not "French".
 In the 2007 election campaign, he referred to fellow-candidate Nicolas Sarkozy, who is of partial Greek Jewish and Hungarian descent, as "foreign" or "the foreigner."
In a 2014 video on the National Front's website, Le Pen reacted to criticism of him by Jewish singer Patrick Bruel with "next time we'll do a whole oven batch!" Le Pen later claimed the comments made no anti-Semitic connotations "except for my political enemies or imbeciles".

Arguing that his party includes people of various ethnic or religious origins like Jean-Pierre Cohen, Farid Smahi or Huguette Fatna, he has attributed some anti-Semitism in France to the effects of Muslim immigration to Europe and suggested that some part of the Jewish community in France might eventually come to appreciate National Front ideology. Le Pen has denied man-made climate change and has linked climate science with communism.

He also infamously compared gays to soup with salt, saying "it's like salt with soup: if there is not enough, it's too bland, and if it's too much, it's undrinkable" and compared pedophilia with "the exaltation of homosexuality".

Prosecution concerning Holocaust denial
Le Pen has made several provocative statements concerning the Holocaust which have been interpreted by the legal system as constituting Holocaust denial. He has been convicted of racism or inciting racial hatred at least six times. Thus, on 13 September 1987, he said, "I ask myself several questions. I'm not saying the gas chambers didn't exist. I haven't seen them myself. I haven't particularly studied the question. But I believe it's just a detail in the history of World War II." For Le Pen, the French deportation of 76,000 Jews from France to Nazi concentration camps, where they were killed, is a trivial matter, and he denies that 6 million Jews were killed, saying "I don't think there were that many deaths. There weren't 6 million ... There weren't mass murders as it's been said." He was eventually condemned under the Gayssot Act to pay 1.2 million francs (€183,200).

In 1997, the European Parliament, of which Le Pen was then a member, removed his parliamentary immunity so that Le Pen could be tried by a German court in Germany, for comments he made at a December 1996 press conference before the German Republikaner party. Echoing his 1987 remarks in France, Le Pen stated: "If you take a 1,000-page book on World War II, the concentration camps take up only two pages and the gas chambers 10 to 15 lines. This is what one calls a detail." In June 1999, a Munich court found this statement to be "minimizing the Holocaust, which caused the deaths of six million Jews," and convicted and fined Le Pen for his remarks. Le Pen retorted sarcastically: "I understand now that it's the Second World War which is a detail of the history of the gas chambers."

Other legal problems and allegations

Prosecution for assault: In April 2000, Le Pen was suspended from the European Parliament following prosecution for the physical assault of Socialist candidate Annette Peulvast-Bergeal during the 1997 general election. This ultimately led to him losing his seat in the European parliament in 2003. The Versailles appeals court banned him from seeking office for one year.
Statements about Muslims in France: In 2005 and 2008, Le Pen was fined, in both case €10,000 for "incitement to discrimination, hatred and violence towards a group of people", on account of statements made about Muslims in France. In 2010. The European Court of Human Rights declared Le Pen's application inadmissible.
Allegations of war crimes in Algeria: Le Pen allegedly practiced torture during the Algerian War (1954–1962), when he was a lieutenant in the French Army. He denied it and won some trials. But he lost a trial when he attacked Le Monde newspaper on charges of defamation, following accusations by the newspaper that he had used torture. Le Monde has produced in May 2003 the dagger he allegedly used to commit war crimes as court evidence. Although war crimes committed during the Algerian War are amnestied in France, this was publicised by the newspapers Le Canard Enchaîné, Libération, and Le Monde, and by Michel Rocard (ex-Prime Minister) on TV (TF1 1993). Le Pen sued the papers and Michel Rocard. This affair ended in 2000 when the Cour de cassation (French supreme jurisdiction) concluded that it was legitimate to publish these assertions. In 1995, Le Pen unsuccessfully sued Jean Dufour, regional counselor of the Provence-Alpes-Côte d'Azur (French Communist Party) for the same reason.

Public image

Public perception
Le Pen is often nicknamed the "Menhir", due to his "granitic nature" as he is perceived as someone who does not give way to pressure or who cannot be easily knocked down. It also connects him to France's Celtic origins. Le Pen is often described as one of the most flamboyant and charismatic orators in Europe, whose speech blends folksy humour, crude attacks and rhetorical finesse.

However, Le Pen remains a polarizing figure in France: opinions regarding him tend to be quite strong. A 2002 IPSOS poll showed that while 22% of the electorate have a good or very good opinion of Le Pen, and 13% an unfavorable opinion, 61% have a very unfavorable opinion.

Le Pen and the National Front are described by much of the media and nearly all commentators as far right. Le Pen himself and the rest of his party disagree with this label; earlier in his political career, Le Pen described his position as "neither right, nor left, but French" (ni droite, ni gauche, français). He later described his position as right-wing and opposed to the "socialo-communists" and other right-wing parties, which he deems are not real right-wing parties. At other times, for example during the 2002 election campaign, he declared himself "socially left-wing, economically right-wing, nationally French" (socialement à gauche, économiquement à droite, nationalement français). He further contends that most of the French political and media class are corrupt and out of touch with the real needs of the common people, and conspire to exclude Le Pen and his party from mainstream politics. Le Pen criticizes the other political parties as the "establishment" and lumped all major parties (Communist, Socialist, Union for French Democracy (UDF) and Rally for the Republic (RPR)) into the "Gang of Four" (la bande des quatre – an allusion to the Gang of Four during China's Cultural Revolution).

Relations with other groups
Some of Le Pen's statements led other right-wing groups, such as the Austrian Freedom Party, and some National Front supporters, to distance themselves from him. Controversial Dutch anti-Islam lawmaker Geert Wilders, who has often been accused of being far-right, has also criticized Le Pen. Bruno Mégret left the National Front to found his own party (the National Republican Movement, MNR), claiming that Le Pen kept the Front away from the possibility of gaining power. Mégret wanted to emulate Gianfranco Fini's success in Italy by making it possible for right-wing parties to ally themselves with the Front, but claimed that Le Pen's attitude and outrageous speech prevented this. Le Pen's daughter Marine leads an internal movement of the Front that wants to "normalize" the National Front, "de-enclave" it, have a "culture of government" etc.; however, relations with Le Pen and other supporters of the hard line are complex. Le Pen's National Front electoral successes along with the party gaining wider public prominence led to suggestions for the renewal of the pan-European alliance of extreme-right parties with Le Pen as its figurehead, a suggestion that eventually did indeed bring about the establishment of the Europe of Nations and Freedom group in the European Parliament, chaired by Le Pen's daughter Marine.

On 22 March 2018, Le Pen joined the Alliance for Peace and Freedom. In October 2021, he endorsed Éric Zemmour for the 2022 French presidential election over his daughter Marine.

Decorations
Officer of the French Foreign Legion
Cross for Military Valour
Croix du combattant
Colonial Medal
Indochina Campaign commemorative medal
North Africa Security and Order Operations Commemorative Medal
Middle-East operations commemorative medal

Electoral history

Presidential

See also

 Politics of France
 History of far-right movements in France

References

Further reading
 Bar-On, Tamir. Rethinking the French New Right: Alternatives to Modernity (Routledge, 2013).
 Chombeau, Christiane. Le Pen: fille et père Panama Editions 2007
 Fauchoux, Marc and Forcari, Christophe. Le Pen, le derniner combat Jacob-Duvernet Editions. 2007
 Hainsworth, Paul. "The extreme right in France: the rise and rise of Jean‐Marie Le Pen's front national." Representation 40.2 (2004): 101–114.
 Le Pen, Jean-Marie. Mémoires : fils de la nation Mueller Editions 
 Marcus, Jonathan. The National Front and French Politics: The Resistible Rise of Jean-Marie Le Pen (NYU Press, 1995).
 Mayer, Nonna. "From Jean-Marie to Marine Le Pen: electoral change on the far right." Parliamentary Affairs 66.1 (2013): 160–178.
 Shields, James. The extreme right in France: from Pétain to Le Pen (Routledge, 2007).
 Singer, Daniel. "The resistible rise of Jean‐Marie Le Pen." Ethnic and Racial Studies 14.3 (1991): 368–381.
 Soffer, Dalya. "The use of collective memory in the populist messaging of Marine Le Pen." Journal of European Studies 52.1 (2022): 69-78. online

 Stockemer, Daniel, and Abdelkarim Amengay. "The voters of the FN under Jean-Marie Le Pen and Marine Le Pen: Continuity or change&quest." French Politics 13.4 (2015): 370–390.
 Wilsford, David, ed. Political leaders of contemporary Western Europe: a biographical dictionary (Greenwood, 1995) pp. 271–74.

External links

News articles and videos
Jews for Le Pen  from Haaretz

Criticism
Jean-Marie Le Pen: A Right-Wing Extremist and His Party from the Anti-Defamation League

 
1928 births
Living people
People from Morbihan
Jean-Marie
French Roman Catholics
Politicians from Brittany
Union for the Defense of Tradesmen and Artisans politicians
National Centre of Independents and Peasants politicians
Deputies of the 3rd National Assembly of the French Fourth Republic
Deputies of the 1st National Assembly of the French Fifth Republic
Deputies of the 8th National Assembly of the French Fifth Republic
Candidates in the 1974 French presidential election
Candidates in the 1988 French presidential election
Candidates in the 1995 French presidential election
Candidates in the 2002 French presidential election
Candidates in the 2007 French presidential election
National Rally (France) MEPs
MEPs for France 1984–1989
MEPs for France 1989–1994
MEPs for France 1994–1999
MEPs for France 1999–2004
MEPs for South-East France 2004–2009
MEPs for South-East France 2009–2014
MEPs for South-East France 2014–2019
Right-wing populism in France
French anti-communists
French nationalists
French traditionalist Catholics
French critics of Islam
Political party founders
People named in the Panama Papers
Soldiers of the French Foreign Legion
French people of the Algerian War
French military personnel of the Algerian War
French military personnel of the First Indochina War
People convicted of assault
People convicted of Holocaust denial
People convicted of racial hatred offences
French politicians with disabilities
French politicians convicted of crimes
French Holocaust deniers
Antisemitism in France
Politicians affected by a party expulsion process
French political party founders
Authoritarianism